Dublin is a town in Jackson Township, Wayne County, in the U.S. state of Indiana. The population was 679 at the 2020 census.

History
Dublin was laid out and platted in 1830. It is named after the city of Dublin in Ireland. A post office has been in operation at Dublin since 1833. On October 15, 1851, the Indiana Woman's Suffrage Association was created in Dublin. The Witt-Champe-Myers House was added to the National Register of Historic Places in 1995.

Geography
Dublin is located at  (39.811806, -85.206166).

Demographics

2010 census
At the 2010 census, there were 790 people, 325 households,and 210 families living in the town. The racial make-up of the town was 98.0% White, 0.3% African American, 0.5% Asian and 1.3% from two or more races. Hispanic or Latino of any race were 0.9% of the population.

There were 325 households, of which 31.1% had children under the age of 18 living with them, 52.0% were married couples living together, 9.2% had a female householder with no husband present, 3.4% had a male householder with no wife present and 35.4% were non-families. 30.8% of all households were made up of individuals, and 17.6% had someone living alone who was 65 years of age or older. The average household size was 2.43 and the average family size was 3.05.

The median age in the town was 42.1 years. 22.9% of residents were under the age of 18; 7.3% were between the ages of 18 and 24; 23.3% were from 25 to 44; 27.7% were from 45 to 64; and 18.7% were 65 years of age or older. The gender makeup of the town was 47.2% male and 52.8% female.

2000 census
At the 2000 census, there were 697 people, 263 households and 203 families living in the town. The racial make-up of the town was 99.28% White, 0.14% Asian and 0.57% from two or more races. Hispanic or Latino of any race were 0.57% of the population.

There were 263 households, of which 37.6% had children under the age of 18 living with them, 61.2% were married couples living together, 9.9% had a female householder with no husband present and 22.8% were non-families. 20.2% of all households were made up of individuals, and 12.5% had someone living alone who was 65 years of age or older. The average household size was 2.65 and the average family size was 3.03.

28.1% of the populationn were under the age of 18, 7.2% from 18 to 24, 27.7% from 25 to 44, 23.2% from 45 to 64 and 13.8% were 65 years of age or older. The median age was 36 years. For every 100 females, there were 90.4 males. For every 100 females age 18 and over, there were 86.2 males.

The median household income was $31,111 and the median family income was $31,488. Males had a median income of $29,028 and females $17,500. The per capita income was $13,656. About 8.6% of families and 13.9% of the population were below the poverty line, including 23.9% of those under age 18 and 5.7% of those age 65 or over.

Education
The town has a lending library, the Dublin Public Library.

References

Towns in Indiana
Towns in Wayne County, Indiana